Major-General Francis Ventris CB (1857–1929) was Commander of British Forces in China.

Military career
The son of Edward Favell Ventris, who was Vicar of West Mersea in Essex before becoming Rector of Church Aston, Newport, Shropshire, by his wife Rose (née Fisher), he was educated at Adams' Grammar School in Newport. Ventris was commissioned into the 44th Regiment of Foot in 1875. He became an Adjutant of that Regiment in 1880. In 1897, having served as an Assistant Adjutant-General in India, he was given command of a district in that country. In 1903 he became a Brigadier commanding troops in North China.

He retired in 1909 but was then recalled at the start of World War I to become General Officer Commanding 25th Division in September 1914. In 1915 he was appointed Commander of British Forces in China, a post he relinquished in 1921.

He was given the colonelcy of the Essex Regiment in 1904, a position he held until his death.

He died in 1929. He had married Helen Maud Davies in 1883, and was father to three sons and two daughters. His eldest son Edward (1885-1938) was the father of Michael Ventris, who deciphered Linear B. His youngest son Second Lieutenant Alan Favell Ventris of the South Lancashire Regiment was killed in action near Ypres on 14 September 1915, age 18 years, and is interred at Birr Crossroads Cemetery.

References

 

 

1857 births
1929 deaths
British Army major generals
British Army generals of World War I
Essex Regiment officers
Companions of the Order of the Bath
44th Regiment of Foot officers